Gourahari Naik (died January 23, 2020) was a politician from Odisha, India. He represented the Patna (Odisha Vidhan Sabha constituency) twice.

References

Year of birth missing
Members of the Odisha Legislative Assembly
2020 deaths
People from Kendujhar district